Sue Funch (born 24 June 1955) is an Australian former butterfly swimmer. She competed in three events at the 1972 Summer Olympics.

References

External links
 

1955 births
Living people
Australian female butterfly swimmers
Olympic swimmers of Australia
Swimmers at the 1972 Summer Olympics
Place of birth missing (living people)
20th-century Australian women